Religion in Hungary has been dominated by forms of Christianity for centuries. According to the 2011 census, 54.2% of the Hungarians declared to believe in Christianity, of whom 38.9% were Catholics (for the majority following the Roman Rite, and a minority the Greek Rite), 13.8% were Protestants (11.6% were Calvinists and 2.2% were Lutherans), 0.1% were Orthodox Christians, and 1.3% were members of other Christian groups. At the same time, 27.2% of the Hungarians did not declare a religious affliation, 16.7% declared explicitly to be not religious and 1.5% atheists. Minority religions practised in Hungary include Buddhism (0.1% in 2011), Islam and Judaism (0.1% in 2011).

Christianity

The majority of Hungarians became Christian in the 11th century. Hungary's first king, Saint Stephen I, took up Western Christianity, although his mother Sarolt was baptized into Eastern Christianity. Hungary remained predominantly Catholic until the 16th century, when the Reformation took place and, as a result, first Lutheranism and then soon afterwards Calvinism became the religion of almost the entire population. Protestants composed some 85–90% of the entire population, more than a half of the Hungarian population being part of the Calvinist confessing Reformed Church and a quarter of Lutheran confessing Evangelical Church.

In the second half of the 16th century, however, the Catholic Habsburg Kings and Jesuits led a successful campaign of Counter-Reformation among the Hungarians. The Jesuits founded educational institutions, including Péter Pázmány Catholic University, the oldest university that still exists in Hungary, and also organized missions in order to promote popular piety.

Using both political and apologetic efforts, most of the High Nobility composing the Diet was already predominantly Catholic by the 1640s, a process consolidated as the new reconquered estates were granted to the converted aristocracy, who supported in Counter-Reformation. Despite this, the lower nobility, the town burghers and the common people still retained a largely Protestant – especially Calvinist – identity, opposing the catholic German-likeness of the Habsburg courtly politics. Allied with the Constitutional Rights enforced by the Nobility and the military pressure of the Protestant Principality of Transylvania on the eastern border, the Catholic Counter-Reformation achieved partial results compared to the other Habsburg-controlled possessions, like Bohemia and Austria, where Catholicism was restored to the status of the sole religion of the realm.

Some of the eastern parts of the country, especially around Debrecen (nicknamed "the Calvinist Rome"), still have significant Protestant communities. The Reformed Church in Hungary is the second-largest church in Hungary with 1,153,442 adherents as of 2011. The church has 1,249 congregations, 27 presbyteries, and 1,550 ministers. The Reformed Church supports 129 educational institutions and has 4 theological seminaries, located in Debrecen, Sárospatak, Pápa, and Budapest.

Lutheranism is the third main historical Christian denomination in Hungary. It was introduced by Saxon settlers in the early 16th century, but after its brief efflorescence, the introduction of the Reformed Church and the Counter-Reformation made it almost non-existent amongst Hungarians up to the late 17th century. Later it was re-introduced through inward migration by Saxons and Slovaks. Today, the Evangelical-Lutheran Church in Hungary is a small minority in Hungary. Despite its relatively small number of adherents, it had a strong power and influence in internal politics since Hungary's independence from the strongly Catholic Habsburg Empire.

The proportion of all Protestantism in Hungary has decreased from around 27% in the early 20th century to about 16% in the early 21st century. Eastern Orthodoxy in Hungary has been the religion mainly of certain national minorities in the country, notably Romanians, Rusyns, Ukrainians, and Serbs. Hungary has also been the home of a sizable Armenian Catholic community. They worship according to the Armenian Rite, but they have united with the Catholic Church under the primacy of the Pope. Some of the Armenians in Hungary are adherents of the Armenian Apostolic Church.

The Church of Jesus Christ of Latter-day Saints was legally recognized in Hungary in June 1988 and its first meetinghouse in the country was dedicated in October of the following year by President Thomas S. Monson. In June 1990, the Hungary Budapest Mission was created, followed by the first stake in June 2006. The mission, its districts, and the Budapest Hungary Stake together contain twenty-two wards and branches serving approximately 5000 members.

Judaism

Historically, Hungary was home to a significant Jewish community. In the 19th century, the pressures of Jewish emancipation, acculturation and secularization led growing tension between modernists and traditionalists. These culminated in 1871, when a communal schism between the Neologs, roughly equivalent to American Conservative Judaism, and Orthodox, divided Hungarian Jews. The census of January 1941 found that 4.3% of the population, or around 400,000 people, were considered of the Jewish religion (not including Christians of Jewish descent or converts to Christianity, who were registered as Jews by race under the new Anti-Jewish laws). In 2011, only 10,965 Jews (0.1% of the population) remained. Some Hungarian Jews were able to escape the Holocaust during World War II, but most (perhaps 550,000) either were deported to concentration camps, from which the majority did not return, or were murdered by the Arrow Cross fascists. Most Jewish people who remain in Hungary live in the centre of Budapest, especially in district VII. The largest synagogue in Europe, the Dohány Street Synagogue, is located in Budapest.

Islam

The influence of Muslims in Hungary was especially pronounced in the 16th century during the time of the Ottoman rule. According to the 2011 census, there were 5,579 Muslims in Hungary, less than 0.1% of the total population. Of these, 4,097 declared themselves as Hungarian and 2,369 as Arab by ethnicity.

Buddhism

In recent decades Buddhism has spread to Hungary, primarily in its Vajrayana forms through the activity of Tibetan missionary monks. Since in Hungary religions are encouraged to institutionalise into church (egyház) bodies in order to be recognised by the government, various institutions have formed, including the Hungarian Buddhist Church (Magyarországi Buddhista Egyházközösség), the Gate of Dharma Buddhist Church (A Tan Kapuja Buddhista Egyház), and others, mostly Vajrayana. A Shaolin temple, the Hungarian Shaolin Temple, was founded in Budapest in 1994.

"Navayana" Buddhism or Ambedkarite Buddhism, a recent Buddhist denomination emerged among the Dalits of India, a form of Buddhism socially and politically engaged for the betterment of the conditions of marginalised peoples, has been spread also to the Romani ethnic minority of Hungary.

Paganism

A rise of Neopagan (Újpogányság) movements has occurred in Hungary over the last decades. Traditional Hungarian paganism, based on Hungarian mythology and shamanism (Táltos tradition), has been revived and is known as Ősmagyar Vallás ("Ancient Hungarian Religion"). The Traditional Church of the Order of Arpad (Árpád Rendjének Jogalapja Tradicionális Egyház), the Ancient Hungarian Church (Ősmagyar Egyház), the Community of the Hungarian Religion (Magyar Vallás Közössége), the Ancient Hungarian Táltos Church (Ősmagyar Táltos Egyház), the Yotengrit, and various Táltos groups are representative of this religion.

Some Hungarians espouse Turanist ideas, and therefore other Táltos are affiliated with Tengrism. The Tengri Community (Tengri Közösség) is one of the Tengrist churches of Hungary. Wicca, a religion of English origin, has spread to Hungary as in the other countries of Western Europe. Zsuzsanna Budapest, a Hungarian who emigrated to the United States, is the founder of the Wiccan denomination known as Dianic Wicca, popular in North America. The Celtic Wiccan Tradition Church (Kelta-Wicca Hagyományőrzők Egyháza) is a Celtic Wiccan church in Hungary.

Demographics

Census statistics

Line chart

Religion by county

Other surveys

 Eurobarometer 2005 found that 44% of the Hungarians answered that they believed there is a God, 31% answered they believed there is some sort of spirit or life force, and 19% that they do not believe there is a God, spirit, or life force.
 A Pew Research Center survey published in 2015 found that 76% of the population of Hungary declared to be Christians, 21% unaffiliated—a category which includes atheists, agnostics and those who describe their religion as "nothing in particular", while 3% belonged to other faiths. The Christians were divided between 56% who were Catholic, 13% who were Calvinists, 7% who were other Christians and less than 1% who were Eastern Orthodox. At the same time the unaffiliated were divided between 5% who were atheists and 16% who answered "nothing in particular".
 International Social Survey Programme 2015 found that 83.4% of the Hungarian population declared to belong to a Christian denomination, with Catholicism being the largest denomination amounting to 62.6% of the respondents (including Greek Catholics at 3.2%), Calvinism was the second-largest sect amounting to 16.6%, and Lutheranism the third-largest with 3.2%. A further 15.5% declared to have no religion, 1.0% to belong to another Christian denomination and 0.9% declared to belong to other religions.
 Eurobarometer 2015 found that 74.6% of the Hungarians regarded themselves as Christians, divided between a 60.3% who were Catholics, 1.1% Eastern Orthodox, 5.1% Protestants, and 8.1% other Christians. The unaffiliated people made up 21.2% of the respondents and were divided between atheists with 2.7% and agnostics with 18.5%.
 In 2018, according to a study jointly conducted by London's St Mary's University's Benedict XVI Centre for Religion and Society and the Institut Catholique de Paris, and based on data from the European Social Survey 2014–2016, among the 16 to 29 years-old Hungarians 33% were Christians (26% Catholic, 6% Protestant and 1% other Christians) and 67% were not religious.
 A Pew Research Center survey published in 2018 found that 75% of the population of Hungary were raised as Christians, while 76% of the population of Hungary today declared to be Christians.

Notes

References